Events from the year 1892 in Denmark.

Incumbents
 Monarch – Christian IX
 Prime minister – J. B. S. Estrup

Events

 20 April – The 1892 Danish Parliamentary Election takes place.
 22 June – Fanø Nordsøbad is inaugurated on the island of Fanø.

Undated

Culture

Music
 8 April  Carl Nielsen's String Quartet No. 2 is for the first time performed in public in Copenhagen.

Births
 17 February – Poul Jørgensen (gymnast), gymnast (died 1973)
 4 April – Charles Christian Lauritsen, Danish-American physicist/ died 1968
 9 August – Thomas Dinesen, Danish-Canadian military officer and recipient of the Victoria Cross (died 1979)

Deaths
 August 6 - Ernst Immanuel Cohen Brandes, economist, writer, and editor (born (1844)
 22 December – M Wilhelm Hellesen, industrialist and inventor /born 1836)

References

 
Years of the 19th century in Denmark